Pietro Leon (died 1474) was a Roman Catholic prelate who served as Bishop of Ceneda (1445–1474) and Bishop of Ossero (1436–1445).

Biography
On 6 February 1436, Pietro Leon was appointed during the papacy of Pope Eugene IV as Bishop of Ossero.
On 4 June 1445, he was appointed during the papacy of Pope Eugene IV as Bishop of Ceneda.
He served as Bishop of Ceneda until his death in 1474.

References

External links and additional sources
 (for Chronology of Bishops) 
 (for Chronology of Bishops) 

15th-century Italian Roman Catholic bishops
Bishops appointed by Pope Eugene IV
Date of birth unknown
1474 deaths